The montane long-nosed squirrel (Hyosciurus heinrichi) is a species of rodent in the family Sciuridae. It is endemic to central Sulawesi, Indonesia. 
Its natural habitat is subtropical or tropical dry lowland grassland. It was discovered during a 1930 expedition led by Gerd Heinrich.

References

Thorington, R. W. Jr. and R. S. Hoffman. 2005. Family Sciuridae. pp. 754–818 in Mammal Species of the World a Taxonomic and Geographic Reference. D. E. Wilson and D. M. Reeder eds. Johns Hopkins University Press, Baltimore.

Hyosciurus
Rodents of Sulawesi
Mammals described in 1935
Taxa named by Richard Archbold
Taxonomy articles created by Polbot